Kathiê Goulart Librelato (born 1998) is a Brazilian chess player. She was awarded the title of Woman International Master in 2018.

Chess career

She has represented Brazil in the Chess Olympiad:
 In 2016, scoring 4½/8 on board four.
 In 2018, scoring 6½/10 on board three.
 In 2022, scoring 6½/11 on board two.

See also
 List of female chess players

References

External links
 
 
 

1998 births
Living people
Brazilian female chess players
Chess Olympiad competitors
Chess Woman FIDE Masters